The El Salvador national basketball team is the official national representative of El Salvador in international men's basketball. It is governed by the Federación Salvadoreña de Baloncesto (FESABAL).

It plays in the FIBA Americas division, and more specifically, within the Central American region. 

Most of its players come from the Liga Mayor de Baloncesto.

History
On April 20, 2021, after five days of play, El Salvador advanced to the second round of 2023 FIBA Basketball World Cup qualification. The week of games were played at the Gimnasio Nacional José Adolfo Pineda in the city of San Salvador. 

The hosts took a 68-66 victory over Jamaica, a game in which a loss would have meant elimination. A three-pointer by José Araujo, with 49 seconds remaining sealed the win for El Salvador.

Center Ronnie Aguilar was crucial in defense, as he blocked Kevin Foster at the end of the game and avoided the tie on the scoreboard. Jamaica came close to 67-66. Aguilar was sent to the free throw line and only hit the second shot with two seconds left on the clock. Jamaica was left without any timeouts and ran out of time to take a shot.

The celebration was immediate between players and fans. Roberto Martínez was the offensive leader from El Salvador with 19 points. Aguilar and Araujo added 11 each. Jamaica was led by Omari Johnson with 18 points and Marcel Robinson with 12 points.

Regional championships

CARICOM Men's Championships

COCABA championships
 2004 3rd place
 2007 3rd place
 2013 2nd place

Pan American Games

1959: 7th place

Centrobasket – Central American Championships

 1967 5th place
 1971 5th place
 1977 5th place
 1985 7th place
 1989 10th place
 1997 7th place
 2008 7th place
 2014 10th place

Central American and Caribbean Games
1959: Gold medal

Current roster
At the 2023 FIBA Basketball World Cup qualification (Americas):

Head coach history
  Agustín Garcia
  Adolfo “el Jocote” Rubio (1959)
  Fito "Jocote" Rubio
  Josep Clarós – (1995)
  Ivan Barahona - (January 2013-2014),2017
  Luis Nicoletti (July 2015 - )
  Ivan Barahona - (-July 2017)
  Ray Santana (July 2017- March 2023)

Past rosters
At 2014 Centrobasket:

References

External links

http://www.latinbasket.com/El-Salvador/basketball-National-Team.asp

Basketball in El Salvador
Men's national basketball teams
Basketball
1956 establishments in El Salvador